Xanthopimpla is a genus of parasitoid wasps belonging to the family Ichneumonidae.

The genus has almost cosmopolitan distribution.

Species:
 Xanthopimpla abnormis Krieger, 1914 
 Xanthopimpla acuta Seyrig, 1932

References

Pimplinae
Ichneumonidae genera